Karel Lichtnégl (30 August 1936 – 15 January 2015) was a Czech former football player who competed for silver-medal-winning Czechoslovakia in the 1964 Summer Olympics. At club level he played for teams including Zbrojovka Brno.

References

External links
 
 

1936 births
2015 deaths
Czechoslovak footballers
Czechoslovakia international footballers
Olympic footballers of Czechoslovakia
Olympic silver medalists for Czechoslovakia
Olympic medalists in football
Footballers at the 1964 Summer Olympics
Medalists at the 1964 Summer Olympics
People from Hodonín
SK Slavia Prague players
FC Zbrojovka Brno players
Association football forwards
Czech footballers
Sportspeople from the South Moravian Region